The 1957 UK & Ireland Greyhound Racing Year was the 31st year of greyhound racing in the United Kingdom and Ireland.

Roll of honour

Summary
Marsh Barton Stadium in Exeter closed; many smaller independent tracks were susceptible to closure, mainly due to the fact that government taxing of tote profits outweighed the income from attendances. This was leaving many of them untenable. Regulated tracks under the National Greyhound Racing Club (NGRC) banner were better off and remained successful, with annual tote turnover still around £55 million. The Greyhound Racing Association (GRA) continued to be the most successful greyhound company (as it had been every year since the introduction of racing in 1926). The Chairman Francis Gentle announced that net profits had increased to £119,000 but the sale of Harringay Arena had been agreed because it was operating at a loss. It was sold to the Home and Colonial Stores Ltd. Gentle remains Chairman of the company but relinquishes his role as Managing Director to be replaced by Laddie Lucas.

Ford Spartan won the 1957 English Greyhound Derby and Duet Leader was voted Greyhound of the Year.

Competitions
Kilcaskin Kern won the Irish St Leger and then went through a hectic schedule, flown straight to London to join new trainer Tony Dennis. The fawn dog then qualified for the Cloth of Gold at Charlton with three quick trials on three successive days. The decision was justified after he won the title. He also won Grand Prix at Walthamstow Stadium later in the year.

Ford Spartan (the Derby champion) won Laurels at Wimbledon Stadium but was then surprisingly retired to stud after just fourteen months racing.

Duke of Alva won all his races in reaching the St Leger final at Wembley and recorded sub 40 second runs in each round, the final was televised live on the BBC.

News
Scoutbush was sold for $4,500, shortly after his Cesarewitch victory, to stand at stud in the United States. Sir Arthur Elvin MBE died, he had saved Wembley Stadium and turned it into one of the most famous stadiums in the world. Without him it would have been demolished in 1926. 

Elias Jolley stood trial, after the 80 year old general manager of White City Stadium (Nottingham) was accused of widespread rigging of tote odds and destroying evidence. 
It was agreed by the London Greyhound Tracks committee that any greyhound disqualified for fighting would lose any prize money and trophies but it would not affect the result in terms of betting. 

Derby runner-up Highway Tim was stolen from the kennels of Rosalie Beba, one month after the Derby final but was recovered safely after the van carrying them crashed and the driver was arrested.

Ireland
The unsuccessful ante post Irish Greyhound Derby favourite, Solar Prince, went on to win the Tipperary Cup and Callanan Cup before winning a White City invitation race featuring Kilcaskin Kern, Ballypatrick and Northern King, held on the Oaks final night.

Prairie Champion has his first race was on 10 October 1957, when he participated in the McCalmont Cup at Kilkenny. He won his heat by ten lengths in 29.80 seconds and then won the final. After recording 29.10 seconds in a 525 yards trial at Harold's Cross Stadium he was bought by Al Burnett, who was known for owning the Pigalle Club in London and renamed Pigalle Wonder.

Principal UK races

	

+Track Record

dh=dead heat

References 

Greyhound racing in the United Kingdom
Greyhound racing in the Republic of Ireland
UK and Ireland Greyhound Racing Year
UK and Ireland Greyhound Racing Year
UK and Ireland Greyhound Racing Year
UK and Ireland Greyhound Racing Year